The 2018–19 Libyan Premier League season was an abandoned season that was supposed to be the 46th since its establishment. The season has started on 28 November 2018. Fixtures of the 2018–19 were announced on 30 October 2018.

Al-Nasr were the defending champions. Al-Sadaqa and Abu Salem joined as the promoted clubs from the 2017–18 Libyan First Division. They replaced Qurdabia, Al-Andalus, Ascharara, Abi al Ashhar, Al-Tarsana and Annajma who were relegated to the 2018–19 Libyan First Division.

Summary
Before the start of the season many disagreements took place which led to the postponement of the start of the season several times. The Competition Organising Committee in the Libyan Football Federation has chosen 14 September to be the date of starting the new season but, there were 4 clubs who demanded the postponement of the season. These clubs were Al-Nasr, Al-Ahly Benghazi, Al-Ahly Tripoli, Al-Madina. The reason behind this was that these clubs wanted to hold a meeting for the general assembly for discussing the problems that the previous season has faced and how to avoid them and solve the current . As a result of the clubs demands and the security situations, The Competition Committee delayed the start of the new season until 2 October but didn't hold the general assembly meeting. However, On 12 October the eastern group clubs were hosted in the headquarters of  Darnes Club. The clubs made an agreement to refuse the start of the season until they get their demands from the Football Federation. Their demands were:
 To delay the start of the season for at least 10 November
 To get financial support from the Football Federation
 To reduce the number of relegated clubs from each group from 3 to 2
 To approve Derna Stadium as a match holding stadium in the next season
The Football Federation had accepted their demands except the 2nd point.
On the other hand, All the western clubs (except Al-Ahly Tripoli and Al-Ittihad) also held a meeting in Al-Madina Club  and they also have refused the start of the season until they get their demands which were to get financial support from the Football Federation but the last didn't approve their demands and delayed the season again due to problems and this time until 26 October.
However, another club meeting was held between all the western clubs (except Al-Ittihad and Al-Ittihad Misurata) in  Abu Salem Club headquarters where they agreed to not start the season until the removal of the president of the Libyan Football Federation Jamal Aljaafari.
Meanwhile, the Competition Committee has held the draw of the league without the knowledge of the clubs and without any representative from them in the draw ceremonies and the draw wasn't held in the headquarters of the Football Federation in Tripoli but it was held in Misurata instead. The Competition Committee has also chosen 9 November as a date of starting the new season. However, because of the long postponement of the season which will have a negative effect on the club's especially those who will compete on continental level and will also affect the national team, the clubs Rafik and  Asswehly have agreed to start the new season without any demands. The Competition Committee as usual delayed the season until 21 November to solve some problems. On the other hand the refusing clubs of the East and West which were:
Abu Salem, Aschat, Al-Ahly Tripoli Al-Wahda, Al-Madina, Al-Hilal, Al-Mahalla, Shabaab al Jabal, Darnes and Al Ta'awon have organised a competition for the necessity of keeping their players in the form of games. The competition was under the name of Activator Competition for Libyan Premier League Clubs or Libya Tajma'ona (Libya brings us together). However, some refusing clubs like  Al-Ahly Benghazi  and  Al-Nasr didn't participate in the competition because of their preparation for CAF Champions League preliminary round games as they were camping in Egypt. On 21 November the refusing clubs made a statement indicating their demand for holding the General Assembly meeting and their need for financial support. However, the league has already started and the first game was between Al-Ittihad and Aschat which saw the withdrawal of the latter because of their refusal to start the league before getting what they demanded in the statement. On 24 November, the Executive Office held a meeting to decide whether to keep or withdraw the trust from the LFF president Jamal Aljaafari by the majority of vote. The majority decided to withdraw trust from Jamal Aljaafari and he will be removed from his position temporarily until the New General Assembly meeting which was scheduled to be held on 8 December in Sirte until it was delayed to 20 December in  Marj. However, The league will continue on its scheduled date. The executive office has appointed the former referee and vice president Abdulhakim Alshilmani as the new president for the Libyan Football Federation. 85 clubs representatives have attended the meeting with 82 clubs voting against Jamal Aljaafari, 2 clubs voting for him and 1 club refusing to vote. As a result, Jamal Aljaafari was removed permanently from his position as a president of the Libyan Football Federation.

The second round of matches in the second group featured the first Tripoli Derby of the season, which Al-Ittihad won 2–1 at Misurata Stadium against Al-Ahly Tripoli. The result put Al-Ahly into 12th place temporarily. Other early pace-setters included Al-Akhdar and Shabaab al Jabal who are currently the top two teams in the first group as of mid-February, Asswehly, Al-Madina and Abu Salem who are the second, third and fourth placed teams in the second group respectively as of the first week of February. The third round of matches in the first group featured the first "Benghazi Derby" of the season, which Al-Ahly Benghazi won 1-0 at  Benina Stadium against Al-Nasr.

The season suffered delays several times. It was first delayed in mid-February so that the national team could hold a training camp in Tunisia in preparation for an important match against South Africa. It was delayed again a month later for the same reason.

Early in the season, the LFF announced that the season would continue during Ramadan at night. However, due to the 2019 Western Libya offensive, the LFF decided to suspend the league. Sources inside the LFF indicated that the season was close to being cancelled. However, the LFF decided to postpone the season until June 15 (though at this stage, many foreign coaches had fled the country and foreign players terminated their contracts).

June 15th passed, and there was no sign of the league continuing. The LFF later decided to cancel the season and announced that Al-Ittihad will play in the 2019-20 CAF Confederation Cup and Al-Nasr will play in the 2019-20 CAF Champions League.

Teams

Team changes

Groups
Due to the continued security situation in Libya in 2018 and the difficulty in air-travel for most teams, the participating teams were grouped by their geographical location into two groups of twelve teams. Teams from each group were scheduled to play every team from their group in a home-and-away round robin format with 3 points given for a win and 1 point for a draw.

Stadia and Locations

Stadiums
The following stadiums were chosen by the Competitions Committee to be available to host league games.

1 As per the decision of the Stadiums Assessments Committee of the Libyan Football Federation on 30 October 2018 these stadiums will not host matches until they are repaired. 
On 27 January, the Competition Committee announced the ability of these stadiums to host the league games again.

First stage

Group 1

Standings

Positions by round
The table lists the positions of teams after each week of matches.In order to preserve chronological evolvements, any postponed matches are not included to the round at which they were originally scheduled, but added to the full round they were played immediately afterwards.

Results

Group 2

Standings

Positions by round
The table lists the positions of teams after each week of matches.In order to preserve chronological evolvements, any postponed matches are not included to the round at which they were originally scheduled, but added to the full round they were played immediately afterwards.

Results

Season statistics

Scoring
First goal of the season:   Ashour Shaglof for Al-Sadaqa against Nojom Ajdabiya (28 November 2018)

Top goalscorers

Hat-tricks

Note
(H) – Home ; (A) – Away

Number of teams by City

References

External links
, RSSSF.com
Libyan Premier League 2018/2019, Goalzz.com

Libyan Premier League seasons
Libya
Premier League
Cancelled association football competitions